Jitka Burianová (born 17 January 1977, in Prostějov) is a retired Czech sprinter who specialised in the 400 metres. She represented her country at the 2000 Summer Olympics reaching semifinals individually and placing seventh in the 4 × 400 metres relay.

Competition record

Personal bests
Outdoor
200 metres – 23.31 (-0.1 m/s) (Prague 2000)
400 metres – 50.85 (Sydney 2000)
400 metres hurdles – 58.83 (Vilamoura 1998)
Indoor
200 metres – 23.81 (Prague 2000)
400 metres – 52.51 (Prague 2000)

References

1977 births
Living people
Czech female sprinters
Athletes (track and field) at the 2000 Summer Olympics
Olympic athletes of the Czech Republic
Sportspeople from Prostějov
Olympic female sprinters